The Socotra skink  (Trachylepis socotrana) is a species of skink found in Socotra.

References

Trachylepis
Reptiles described in 1882
Taxa named by Wilhelm Peters
Endemic fauna of Socotra